Robert Juričko (born September 27, 1959) is a retired Croatian footballer.

Born in Split, SR Croatia, he played in the Yugoslav First League with NK Hajduk Split and FK Napredak Kruševac.

References

1959 births
Living people
Footballers from Split, Croatia
Yugoslav footballers
Association football defenders
HNK Hajduk Split players
FK Napredak Kruševac players
NK Solin players
Yugoslav First League players